Aundre Edwards (born 11 December 1980) is a retired Jamaican long jumper.

In the young age categories, he won medals at the 1996 CARIFTA Games, the 1996 Central American and Caribbean Junior Championships and the 1998 Central American and Caribbean Junior Championships. He also competed at the 1998 World Junior Championships without reaching the final. He later won the bronze medal at the 2003 Central American and Caribbean Championships and finished seventh at the 2003 Pan American Games.

He became Jamaican champion in 2003. His personal best jump was 8.07 metres, achieved in June 2003 in Kingston.

References

1980 births
Living people
Jamaican male long jumpers
Athletes (track and field) at the 2003 Pan American Games
Pan American Games competitors for Jamaica
20th-century Jamaican people
21st-century Jamaican people